The enzyme holocytochrome-c synthase (EC 4.4.1.17) catalyzes the chemical reaction

holocytochrome c  apocytochrome c + heme

This enzyme belongs to the family of lyases, specifically the class of carbon-sulfur lyases.  The systematic name of this enzyme class is holocytochrome-c apocytochrome-c-lyase (heme-forming). Other names in common use include cytochrome c heme-lyase, holocytochrome c synthetase, and holocytochrome-c apocytochrome-c-lyase.  This enzyme participates in porphyrin and chlorophyll metabolism.

Cytochrome c heme-lyase (CCHL) and cytochrome Cc1 heme-lyase (CC1HL) are mitochondrial enzymes  that catalyze the covalent attachment of a heme group on two cysteine residues of cytochrome c and c1. These two enzymes are functionally and evolutionary related. There are two conserved regions, the first is located in the central section and the second in the C-terminal section. Both patterns contain conserved histidine, tryptophan and acidic residues which could be important for the interaction of the enzymes with the apoproteins and/or the heme group.

The human enzyme, HCCS, processes both cytochromes c and c1.

References

 

EC 4.4.1
Enzymes of unknown structure